Jack Gravell (14 March 1914 – 6 June 1997) was an  Australian rules footballer who played with St Kilda in the Victorian Football League (VFL).

Notes

External links 

1914 births
1997 deaths
Australian rules footballers from Victoria (Australia)
St Kilda Football Club players
Prahran Football Club players